Adihalli may refer to places in India:

 Adihalli (Arsikere), Hassan District, Karnataka
 Adihalli (Channarayapatna), Hassan District, Karnataka
 Adihalli (Krishnarajpet), Mandya District, Karnataka